Puthuparamba or puthuparambu  is a natural village in Edarikode Grama Panchayath which located near to NH 66 Pookipparamba Malappuram District of Kerala, India.
Postal code is 676501 (puthuparamba sub post office)

Geography
It is situated 45 km south of Calicut city and 15 km west of Malappuram city. It is under the Edarikkode panchayat. The village is bounded by the Kadalundi River on the north and east. Puthupparmb is under Tirurangadi taluk and edarikkode village.

Education
A government higher secondary school (G.H.S.S. Puthupparamba) and a women's polytechnic college are the major educational institutions.

Moulana Abdul Bari Islamic Academy, Madrasathul Barissunniyya, Bayanul Islam Madrasa are the Islamic institutions.

Politics
Puthupparamba is under the Ponnani Loksabha (lower house) constituency. E.T. Muhammad Basheer is the member of Parliament. Jaleel Manammal is the President of Edarikode panchayat, which includes Puthupparamba. The population is politically active.

Culture
Puthuparamb village is a predominantly Muslim populated area.  Hindus exist in comparatively smaller numbers.  
Muslims gather in mosques for the evening prayer and continue to sit there after the prayers discussing social and cultural issues.  Business and family issues are also sorted out during these evening meetings.  The Hindu minority of this area keeps their rich traditions by celebrating various festivals in their temples.  Hindu rituals are done here with a regular devotion like other parts of Kerala.

Transportation
Puthuparamba village connects to other parts of India through Kottakkal town.  National highway No.66 passes through Tanur and the northern stretch connects to Goa and Mumbai.  The southern stretch connects to Cochin and Trivandrum.  State Highway No.28 starts from Nilambur and connects to Ooty, Mysore and Bangalore through Highways.12,29 and 181. National Highway No.966 connects to Palakkad and Coimbatore.  The nearest airport is at Kozhikode.  The nearest major railway station is at Tirur.

References

   Villages in Malappuram district
Kottakkal area